Kingston Wood and Outliers is a  biological Site of Special Scientific Interest south-west of Kingston in Cambridgeshire. The site comprises Kingston Wood itself, Pincote Wood, Hawk's Wood and Lady Pastures Spinney.

This ancient woodland is ash and field maple on chalky clay, and it is described by Natural England as one of the oldest and most intact coppiced woodlands in the county. Ground flora include dog's mercury and the nationally restricted oxlip.

The site is private with no public access.

References

External links

Sites of Special Scientific Interest in Cambridgeshire